Dream Brother: The Lives and Music of Jeff and Tim Buckley is a biography by the American author, journalist, and former music critic for Entertainment Weekly, David Browne. First published on February 1, 2001, the book is a dual biography of Jeff Buckley, American songwriter and musician, and Tim Buckley, his father, also a musician. The book outlines the lives and deaths of the musicians in chapters which alternate between father and son. As part of his research, Browne interviewed over 100 friends, colleagues, and family members of the two Buckleys. Kirkus Reviews gave the book a lukewarm review, saying it would please fans but would hold little interest for others.

References

External links 
 
"Remember Me?" - an extract in The Guardian (part two)

American biographies
2001 non-fiction books
HarperCollins books
Books about musicians